Konstantinos Pantelidis (born 1901, date of death unknown) was a Greek sprinter and long jumper. He competed in four events at the 1924 Summer Olympics.

References

External links
 

1901 births
Year of death missing
Greek male sprinters
Greek male long jumpers
Olympic athletes of Greece
Athletes (track and field) at the 1924 Summer Olympics
20th-century Greek people